Alexander of Islay or Alexander MacDonald (died 1449) was a medieval Scottish nobleman, who succeeded his father Domhnall of Islay as Lord of the Isles (1423–1449) and rose to the rank of Earl of Ross (1437–49). His lively career, especially before he attained the earldom of Ross, led Hugh MacDonald, the 17th century author of History of the MacDonalds, to commemorate him as "a man born to much trouble all his lifetime". Alexander allied himself with King James I of Scotland against the power of the 
Albany Stewarts in 1425 but, once the Albany Stewarts were out of the way, Alexander quickly found himself at odds with the new king. War with King James would initially prove Alexander's undoing, and would see the King's power in Scotland greatly increased, but at the Battle of Inverlochy Alexander's army prevailed against the forces of the King. Alexander died in 1449, having greatly extended his family's landed wealth and power. He was buried, not in the Isles of his ancestors, but at Fortrose Cathedral in his mainland Earldom of Ross.

Biography

Alexander, the Albany Stewarts and King James
Alexander was the great grandson of King Robert II of Scotland and inherited his father Domhnall's alliance with King James I of Scotland against the power of the Albany Stewarts, who by the time James returned to Scotland from English captivity in 1424 ruled more of Scotland than King James could. By 1425 James had decided to destroy the Albany Stewarts once and for all. In May of this year, Alexander attended the Stirling parliament, and sat on the jury of 21 knights and peers which ordered the execution of Murdoch (Muireadhach), Duke of Albany, along with his son Alexander and his ally Donnchadh, Earl of Lennox.

However, the destruction of the Albany Stewarts removed the main reason for the co-operation between the King and the Lord of the Isles. It is possible that, as Michael Brown believes, James acknowledged Alexander's control of the earldom of Ross as a reward for his support against Albany, as in 1426. James did recognize Mariota of the Isles, Alexander's mother, as the heiress of Ross and by this, Alexander became the "Master of the Earldom of Ross".

As early as February, 1420, his father, Donald, Lord of the Isles, appears as "Lord of the Isles and of Ross" in a papal dispensation granted for the marriage of his daughter to a grandson of Governor Albany. However, Richard Oram takes a different view, and sees Alexander's adoption of this title and occupation of much of the earldom as a provocation towards James, since it had passed to him after the death of John Stewart, Earl of Buchan and Ross in 1424, and James was legally entitled the hold the earldom. Alexander's use of this title, if it were provocation, would have been compounded in the king's mind by the fact that Alexander's uncle John Mór MacDonald was harboring and protecting James Mór (or James the Fat), the son of Duke Murdoch, while James Mór was claiming James' throne.

Captivity

At any rate, the king had certainly adopted a more hostile attitude towards Alexander. In 1428, James travelled into the north of Scotland both to assert his authority in Ross and to bring order to the north. James requested a meeting with Alexander, and in August Alexander travelled in good faith to meet James at Inverness, where James was holding court. James however, in an act typical of his kingship, imprisoned Alexander, his mother Mariota (by whose lineage Alexander claimed Ross) and around fifty of his followers, including his uncle and heir-designate John Mór, in the tower of Inverness Castle. Included among the other prisoners were Alexander's most important Ross allies; men such as Aonghas Dubh MacAoidh, the chief of the MacKays of Strathnaver, a man who was reputed to have a warband 4000 strong; a prisoner also was Aonghas' son Niall Óg, the husband of the daughter of the head of the Foulis Munro kindred of Easter Ross, one of Ross' most important families. The head of the Munros himself, George Munro, may also have been arrested, but if he was he was quickly released. William Leslie and John de Ross of Balnagown, two important landowners and kinsmen of Mariota, were also imprisoned, as were the heads of the Wester Ross Lochalsh MacMhathain (Matheson) and the Kintail MacChoinnich (MacKenzie) kindreds. Most of these men, including John Mór, seem to have been released within a short time, although James took a few back to the south with him.

According to Michael Brown and the 17th century History of the MacDonalds, James attempted to do a deal with John Mór, probably offering him the Lordship of the Isles, to which he was heir and for which he had revolted against his brother Domhnall decades before. John however refused to negotiate until Alexander was released. Furthermore, King James' plans met disaster when his messenger James Campbell attempted to arrest "Johannis de Insulis" and killed him in the attempt. King James tried to distance himself from the killing, and had Campbell hanged. Before the end of 1428, Alexander was released on a promise of good behaviour.

War against the King

Almost as soon as he was released, Alexander was at war with the king. Domhnall Ballach ("the Freckled"), son of his uncle John Mór, may have been seeking revenge for his father's death, and if this was the case, he was supported by his other uncle Alasdair Carrach ("the Curly"), Lord of Lochaber. Together, these two men, the two most important nobles in the lordship, probably helped pressure Alexander into war. In Spring 1429, Alexander's forces advanced on Inverness. Although Maol Choluim Mac an Tóisich ("Malcolm MacKintosh"), head of Clan Chattan and custodian of the castle, managed to hold Alexander off, Alexander was still able to burn down the burgh. Alexander, meanwhile, was planning to support James Mór, son of Duke Murdoch, in his claim on the Scottish throne. James Mór had become a serious threat to King James, not merely because was he likely to have the support of Murdoch's former vassals in Lennox, Menteith and Fife, but also because he had obtained the backing of the King of England, who was angry that King James was ignoring his superior status and the terms of his release from captivity in England several years before. Now James Mór had the support of Alexander too.

At this point, however, King James was saved by the sudden death of his rival. As the Annals of the Four Masters reports:

In the summer, King James raised a large army and after a swift march north through Atholl and Badenoch, the royal army encountered Alexander somewhere around the borders of Lochaber and Badenoch. Although according to Walter Bower Alexander had 10,000 men, when the royal standard was unfurled the Chattan and Cameron kindreds switched over to the King. In the following engagement Alexander was defeated. Although Alexander got away, the king capitalized on his victory by marching further north and seizing the castles of Urquhart and Dingwall. The king now sought Alexander's capture, and sent an expedition armed with artillery into the Hebrides. Alexander, who had probably fled to Islay, found himself in a very difficult position, and on 27 August 1429 surrendered to King James at Holyrood Abbey, near the burgh of Edinburgh. King James was persuaded by his magnates to give Alexander grace, and sent him to Tantallon Castle under the custody of William Douglas, 2nd Earl of Angus, King James' nephew.

Second captivity

While he had Alexander in custody, King James delegated the northern campaign to Alexander Stewart, Earl of Mar, with more minor roles going to Maol Choluim Mac an Tóisich, Alexander Seton of Gordon, Hugh Fraser and Aonghas de Moravia. James would never again return to Ross or Moray. Mar was given support in his role as Lieutenant when Alan Stewart, the second son of Walter Stewart, Earl of Atholl, was made Earl of Caithness in Spring 1430. The royal earldoms of Buchan and Ross, and the castle of Urquhart were put under Mar's control; by 1431 the lordship of Lochaber, held by Alasdair Carrach, was assigned to Mar's command; and by 1432 Mar had received papal dispensation to marry Margaret Seton, the mother of the heiresses to the earldom of Moray, which he would administer on their behalf. James, moreover, arranged a marriage between Lachlan Maclean, captain of the MacLeans of Duart, an important vassal kindred of the Lordship of the Isles, to Mar's daughter, bringing Mar's influence into the Lordship of the Isles itself. In 1431 Aonghas de Moravia was sent on a campaign against Aonghas Dubh MacAoidh in Strathnaver. However the main campaign was in Lochaber, where Mar hoped to make his status as Lord of Lochaber a reality. In both campaigns, however, the results were defeats for the king's forces. At the Battle of Inverlochy Mar's forces were met by both Domhnall Ballach and Alasdair Carrach of Lochaber; although Mar managed to make a long escape on foot back to Kildrummy Castle, the Earl of Caithness and 990 men were slain. In 1429, in Strathnaver, at the Battle of Drumnacoub, Aonghas Dubh MacAoidh (Angus MacKay), chief of Clan MacKay was also victorious over royal forces, this battle however was more of a family related feud. Both defeats were incurred before September 1431. James' first reaction was to raise taxes, which were granted on 16 October, in order to deliver a counter-attack; but this revenue was insufficient and James had other problems to deal with. King James therefore arranged a reconciliation with Alexander, who was pardoned for past offences and released from captivity.

Alexander, Earl of Ross

Alexander would never again be the king's enemy, and remained subdued for the next few years. Luck, however, was on Alexander's side. The earl of Mar was in either his fifties or sixties, and his son and heir Thomas had already died in 1430. When the earl himself died in 1435, James' settlement in the north collapsed. James was in Mar by June 1436, where he was taking control of the earldom. It was probably in this time that James finally acknowledged Alexander as earl of Ross, the only magnate who could now offer security in the north-eastern Highlands. Alexander not only received control of Dingwall, but Inverness too, which he would hold until at least 1447. Moreover, the Ross earldom came with Kincardine in The Mearns, Kingedward in Buchan and Greenan in Ayrshire. By January 1437 Alexander was styling himself "Earl of Ross" in his charters, and this style was acknowledged in royal documents by 1439. Finally, by February 1439, Alexander had been appointed Justiciar of Scotia, an office which made Alexander the chief legal official in the Kingdom of Scotland.

Having achieved the chief object of his career, Alexander spent the last decade of his life consolidating his position in Ross. His charters seem to indicate that he was chiefly based at the castles of Dingwall and Inverness, and rarely anywhere else. The large number of charters issued by Alexander at Inverness is probably explained by his role as Justiciar of Scotia. Alexander's move east led to less direct lordship in the west, his original political heartland. Alexander's bastard sons Uisdean (Hugh of Sleat) and Gilleasbaig ("Celestine") were given Sleat and Lochalsh respectively, Domhnall Ballach became more independent in Islay and Kintyre, Clan MacLeod kindred took greater control in Skye and Lewis, Clan MacLean greater control in Mull and Clan MacKintosh greater control in Lochaber.

Marriage and children
Alexander had two consorts with whom he fathered offspring. The daughter of MacPhee produced a number of bastard sons, and secondly he married Elizabeth, the daughter of Alexander Seton, Lord Gordon and had:
John of Islay, Earl of Ross, who succeeded Alexander at age fifteen.
Other children include: 
Hugh MacDonald, Lord of Sleat
Celestine MacDonald, Lord of Lochlash.
Margaret Macdonald
Florence Macdonald

Death
Alexander MacDonald of Islay died at Dingwall in May 1449. He was buried in Fortrose Cathedral.

Ancestry

Notes

References
 Boardman, Stephen, The Campbells, 1250–1513, (Edinburgh, 2006)
 Brown, Michael, James I, (East Linton, 1994)
 MacDougall, Norman, "Achilles' Heel? The Earldom of Ross, the Lordship of the Isles, and the Stewart Kings, 1449-1507", in Edward J. Cowan & R. Andrew McDonald (eds.), Alba: Celtic Scotland in the Medieval Era, (Edinburgh, 2000), pp. 248–75
Oram, Richard, "The Lordship of the Isles, 1336-1545", in Donald Omand (ed.) The Argyll Book, (Edinburgh, 2005), pp. 123–39

External links
 Annals of the Four Masters @ CELT (trans)

Year of birth unknown
Islay, Alexander MacDonald of
Alexander
Islay, Alexander of
Islay, Alexander MacDonald of
15th-century Scottish peers